Chisana Airport  is a state-owned public-use airport serving Chisana, a community located in the Valdez-Cordova Census Area of the U.S. state of Alaska. The National Plan of Integrated Airport Systems for 2011–2015 categorized it as a general aviation facility.

Scheduled airline passenger service at this airport is subsidized by the United States Department of Transportation via the Essential Air Service program.

Facilities and aircraft 
Chisana Airport resides at elevation of 3,318 feet (1,011 m) above mean sea level. It has one runway designated 12/30 with a turf and gravel surface measuring 3,000 by 50 feet (914 x 15 m). For the 12-month period ending December 31, 2005, the airport had 150 aircraft operations, an average of 12 per month: 67% general aviation and 33% air taxi.

Airline and destination 

The following airline offers scheduled passenger service at this airport:

Statistics

References

Other sources 

 Essential Air Service documents (Docket DOT-OST-1998-4574) from the U.S. Department of Transportation:
 90-Day Notice (January 25, 2006): of 40-Mile Air, Ltd., of intent to terminate unsubsidized service at Chisana, Alaska.
 Order 2006-4-13 (April 11, 2006): prohibiting 40-Mile Air from terminating its scheduled, unsubsidized service at Chisana, Alaska, at the end of its 90-day notice period, and requesting proposals from carriers interested in providing essential air service (EAS) at the community, with or without subsidy. 
 Order 2006-6-29 (June 23, 2006): selected 40-Mile Air Ltd. to provide essential air service (EAS) at Chisana, Alaska for the period from July 1, 2006, through June 30, 2008, at an annual subsidy rate of $75,743.
 Order 2008-4-41 (April 29, 2008): selected 40-Mile Air, Inc., to continue providing subsidized EAS at Chisana and Healy Lake for the two-year period through May 31, 2010, and established an annual subsidy rate of $65,546 for two nonstop round trips per week between Chisana and Tok with 3-seat Cessna 185 or 4-seat Cessna 206-207 aircraft.
 Order 2010-4-15 (April 23, 2010): selected 40-Mile Air, Inc., to continue providing EAS at Chisana and Healy Lake for the two-year period through May 31, 2012, and established an annual subsidy rate of $74,345 for two nonstop round trips per week between Chisana and Tok with 3-seat Cessna 185 or 4-seat Cessna 206 or 207 aircraft.
 Order 2012-6-18 (June 22, 2012): re-selecting 40-Mile Air, Inc., to continue providing Essential Air Service (EAS) at Chisana and Healy Lake, Alaska, and establishing annual subsidy rates of $81,040 and $104,703, respectively, for a new two-year period, through May 31, 2014. Two nonstop round trips per week between Chisana and Tok with 3-seat Cessna 185 or 4-seat Cessna 206 or 207 aircraft. Route TKJ-CZN-TKJ.

External links
 FAA Alaska airport diagram (GIF)
 Topographic map as of July 1960 from USGS The National Map

Airports in Copper River Census Area, Alaska
Essential Air Service